In corporate finance,

 the present value of growth opportunities (PVGO) is a valuation measure applied to growth stocks.
It represents the component of the company’s stock value that corresponds to (expected) growth in earnings. 
It thus allows an analyst to assess the extent to which the share price represents the current business, and to what extent it reflects assumptions about the future.
As a proportion of market cap, PVGO can then also be used in relative valuation, i.e. when comparing between two investments  (see similar re PEG ratio).

PVGO is calculated as follows:

This formula arises by thinking of the value of a company as inhering two components:
(i) the present value of existing earnings, i.e. the company continuing as if under a "no-growth policy";
and (ii) the present value of the company's growth opportunities.
PVGO can then simply be calculated as the difference between the stock price and the present value of its zero-growth-earnings; 
the latter, the second term in the formula above, uses the calculation for a perpetuity (see ).

References

Corporate finance
Valuation (finance)
Fundamental analysis